Monkey Chop is a single by British disco artist Dan-I, and is widely recognized as a "one-hit wonder". It was produced by Dan-I.

Track listing 
The single "Monkey Chop" had two A-side-, and two B-side songs:
Side A:
"Monkey Chop"
"We Got Time"
Side B:
"Roller (Do It) Boogie"
"Rollercide (Part One)"

Chart positions

Weekly charts

Year-end charts

References

Disco songs